Raphael Guerreiro (born 24 April 1968) is a retired French football midfielder.

References

1968 births
Living people
French footballers
AJ Auxerre players
Stade Malherbe Caen players
LB Châteauroux players
Racing Besançon players
Association football midfielders
Ligue 1 players
Ligue 2 players